Liu Ying may refer to:

 Liu Ying (210–188 BC), posthumously known as the Emperor Hui of Han 
 Ruzi Ying (5–25), emperor of the Chinese Western Han Dynasty
 Liu Ying (prince) (died 71 AD), son of Emperor Guangwu of Han
 Liu Ying (writer) (born 1974), Chinese writer
 Liu Ying (cyclist) (born 1985), Chinese cross-country mountain bike racer
 Liu Ying (figure skater) (born 1975), Chinese figure skater
 Liu Ying (footballer) (born 1974), Chinese footballer

See also
Liuying (disambiguation)